Douglas Augusto Soares Gomes (born 13 January 1997), simply known as Douglas Augusto, is a Brazilian professional footballer who plays as a midfielder for Greek Super League club PAOK.

Club career

Brazil
Born in Rio de Janeiro, Douglas joined Fluminense's youth setup in 2004, aged seven. On 6 September 2015 he made his first team – and Série A – debut, starting in a 3–1 home loss against rivals Flamengo.

Douglas became an undisputed starter during the 2016 season, renewing his contract until 2021 in February. He scored his first goal on 13 September of that year in a 4–2 home win against Atlético Mineiro.

PAOK
On 1 July 2019, PAOK announced the arrival of Douglas Augusto from Corinthians, signing a four-year contract. In January, Douglas was loaned by Corinthians to EC Bahia, and the 22-year-old subsequently made seven appearances for the latter in the 2019 Série A season. Last year, Douglas began the 2018 Série A season with Fluminense FC, but he later transferred to Corinthians for €1 million in the summer. 
For 2019-2020 and 2020-2021, he was a key member of the team. In the final for the Greek cup on May 22, 2021, PAOK faced OSFP, with PAOK winning 2—1.

International career
On 2 July 2021, Douglas Augusto was named in the Brazil squad for the 2020 Summer Olympics, but was forced to withdraw with a thigh injury.

Career statistics

Club

Honours

Club
PAOK
Greek Cup: 2020–21;Runner-Up :2021–22

References

External links

1997 births
Living people
Footballers from Rio de Janeiro (city)
Brazilian footballers
Brazil under-20 international footballers
Brazilian expatriate footballers
Association football midfielders
Campeonato Brasileiro Série A players
Super League Greece players
Fluminense FC players
Sport Club Corinthians Paulista players
Esporte Clube Bahia players
PAOK FC players
Expatriate footballers in Greece
Brazilian expatriate sportspeople in Greece